John Louis Esposito (born May 19, 1940) is an American academic, professor of Middle Eastern and religious studies, and scholar of Islamic studies, who serves as Professor of Religion, International Affairs, and Islamic Studies at Georgetown University in Washington, D.C. He is also the founding director of the Prince Alwaleed Center for Muslim–Christian Understanding at Georgetown.

Biography
For nearly twenty years after completing his Ph.D., Esposito had taught Religious studies (including Hinduism, Buddhism, and Islam) at the College of the Holy Cross, a Jesuit college in Massachusetts. At the College of the Holy Cross, Esposito held the Loyola Professor of Middle East Studies position, was the chair of the Department of Religious Studies, and director of the College of the Holy Cross' Center for International Studies. At Georgetown University, Esposito holds the position of University Professor and teaches as both Professor of Religion and International Affairs and Professor of Islamic Studies.

He published Islam and Politics in 1984, and Islam: The Straight Path in 1988. Both books sold well, going through many editions. In addition to more than 35 books, he is editor-in-chief of a number of Oxford reference works including The Oxford Encyclopedia of the Modern Islamic World, The Oxford History of Islam, The Oxford Dictionary of Islam, The Oxford Encyclopedia of the Islamic World (six vols.), and Oxford Islamic Studies Online.

In 1988, he was elected president of the Middle East Studies Association of North America (MESA). He has also served as president of the American Academy of Religion and president of the American Council for the Study of Islamic Societies.  He served as Vice Chair of the Board of Directors of the Center for the Study of Islam & Democracy from 1999 to 2004 he was a member of the World Economic Forum’s Council of 100 Leaders, the High Level Group of the U.N. Alliance of Civilizations and the E. C. European Network of Experts on De-Radicalisation. He was an advisor to the award-winning, PBS-broadcast documentary Muhammad: Legacy of a Prophet (2002), produced by Unity Productions Foundation. A recipient of the American Academy of Religion’s 2005 Martin E. Marty Award for the Public Understanding of Religion and of Pakistan’s Quaid-e-Azam Award for Outstanding Contributions in Islamic Studies, in 2003 he received the School of Foreign Service, Georgetown University Award for Outstanding Teaching.

Esposito founded the Center for Muslim-Christian Understanding at Georgetown University in 1993 and is its founding director. The center received a $20 million endowment from Saudi Arabian Prince Alwaleed Bin Talal "to advance education in the fields of Islamic civilization and Muslim-Christian understanding and strengthen its presence as a world leader in facilitating cross-cultural and inter-religious dialogue."

Esposito is a Catholic.

Works
Selected works as author, co-author, or editor, include titlers listed below.

Editor
 The Oxford Encyclopedia of the Islamic World, as editor (2009, 5 volume set) 
 The Oxford History of Islam, as editor (2004) 
 The Islamic World: Past and Present, as editor (2004, 3 volume set) 
 The Oxford Encyclopedia of the Modern Islamic World, as editor (1995, 4 volume set) 
 The Oxford Dictionary of Islam, as editor (1994) 

Books
 Who Speaks for Islam? What a Billion Muslims Really Think, coauthored with Dalia Mogahed (2008) 
 What Everyone Needs to Know About Islam (1st edition: 2002. 2nd edition: 2011) 
 The Future of Islam (2010) 
 Islam: The Straight Path (1st edition: 1988, 3rd edition: 2004) 
 Unholy War: Terror in the Name of Islam (2002) 
 Women in Muslim Family Law, coauthored with Natana J. Delong-Bas  (2nd edition: 2002) 
 Makers of Contemporary Islam, coauthored John Voll (2001) 
 The Islamic Threat: Myth or Reality? (3rd edition: 1999) 
 Political Islam: Radicalism, Revolution or Reform (1997) 

Collections
This section may include written or editorial contributions to collections of works by various scholars.
 Islamophobia: The Challenge of Pluralism in the 21st Century as coeditor with Ibrahim Kalin (2011) 
 Islam in Asia: Religion, Politics, & Society, as editor (2006) 
 Turkish Islam and the Secular State: The Gulen Movement, as coeditor with M. Hakan Yavuz (2003) 
 Modernizing Islam: Religion in the Public Sphere in the Middle East and Europe, as coeditor with Francois Burgat (2003) 
 Iran at the Crossroads, as coeditor with R.K. Ramazani (2000) 
 Muslims on the Americanization Path?, as coeditor with Yvonne Yazbeck Haddad (2000) 
 Islam, Gender and Social Change, as coeditor with Yvonne Yazbeck Haddad (1997) 
 Islam and Politics, as editor (1st edition: 1984, 4th edition: 1998) 
 Islam and Democracy, as coeditor with John Voll (1996) 
 Voices of Resurgent Islam'', as editor (1983)

References

External links

John L. Esposito - The Future of Islam lecture at the University of Kentucky

1940 births
American people of Italian descent
American Roman Catholics
American Islamic studies scholars
Carnegie Council for Ethics in International Affairs
Christian and Islamic interfaith dialogue
Christian scholars of Islam 
College of the Holy Cross faculty
Georgetown University faculty
Harvard University people
Living people
Middle Eastern studies in the United States
People in interfaith dialogue
St. John's University (New York City) alumni
Temple University alumni